The Kyivska is a station on Kharkiv Metro's Saltivska Line. The station was opened on 11 August 1984.

Kharkiv Metro stations
Railway stations opened in 1984